Imaste dio, Ímaste dió or Eimaste dio (meaning 'We are two') is a song by Mikis Theodorakis, the pro-leftist Greek composer and politician.

Background
Ímaste dió was one of the songs written by Mikis Theodorakis for prominent member of the Greek left Andreas Lentakis (1935-1997) towards the end of the 1960s. At the time of the 7 year military dictatorship in Greece this song, whose theme was the torture and isolation of a political detainee in prison, became a major rallying cry of the Greek leftwing political groups. The song is also featured in a comedy by Thanasis Veggos about the forbidden songs in Greece during the time of the Colonels.

Versions
A French version of Eimaste Dio, Nous sommes deux, was popularized by singer Georges Moustaki in the 1970s. A second version was recorded with different lyrics by singer Dalida with the title A chaque fois j'y crois in 1977.

A Swedish version, Två, was recorded by singer Sven-Bertil Taube in 1974.

References

External links
 Page with lyrics and MIDI

Mikis Theodorakis songs
Demis Roussos songs
Songs written by Mikis Theodorakis
1968 songs